is a Japanese professional baseball infielder for the Tohoku Rakuten Golden Eagles in Japan's Nippon Professional Baseball.

External links

NPB.com

1994 births
Living people
People from Koganei, Tokyo
Baseball people from Tokyo Metropolis
Japanese baseball players
Waseda University alumni
Nippon Professional Baseball infielders
Tohoku Rakuten Golden Eagles players